Canadian Lead is a 19th-century gold rush town in rural New South Wales, Australia. It is 301 km to Sydney.

In April 1872, The Maitland Mercury and Hunter River General Advertiser reported that "...the Canadian lead, where a month ago some four hundred people were, can now boost of a couple of thousands."

References list

External links
 State Library of New South Wales. Photographs of Canadian Lead and Home Rule. Retrieved 6 June 2014.